The 2018 Brussels Summit of the North Atlantic Treaty Organization (NATO) was the 29th formal meeting of the heads of state and heads of government of the North Atlantic Treaty Organization, held in Brussels, Belgium, on 11 and 12 July 2018.

Events 
On 10 July 2018 the so-called 2018 Brussels Joint Declaration was signed, between Jean-Claude Juncker, Donald Tusk and Jens Stoltenberg.

On the opening day of the conference the President of the United States, Donald Trump, caused controversy by asserting that Germany is beholden to Russia over its involvement in the Nord Stream 1 gas pipeline project aimed at doubling energy imports from Russia. This was the first time he addressed the leaders since the inauguration ceremony of the new NATO Headquarters, at which he stressed a similar point. German Chancellor Angela Merkel, who grew up in the Soviet-controlled German Democratic Republic, reacted defensively to Trump's comments and tried to deflect them with: "I am very happy that today we are united in freedom, the Federal Republic of Germany. Because of that we can say that we can make our independent policies and make independent decisions."

Leaders and other dignitaries in attendance

Member states

Non-member states and organisations
  – Prime Minister Nikol Pashinyan
  – President Ilham Aliyev
  – President Sauli Niinistö
  – President Giorgi Margvelashvili
  – Prime Minister Zoran Zaev
  – President Petro Poroshenko
  – President Ashraf Ghani

Security 
For the first time a RF Drone Detection System was used (a white dome seen at the right rooftop of the summit picture).

Aftermath
The New York Times reported on 9 August 2018 that Trump's senior national security advisors, concerned that Trump might disrupt the summit as he did by refusing to sign the communiqué at the June G7 summit, scrambled to secure a formal policy agreement during the weeks before the summit.

See also 
2018 Russia–United States summit

References

External links 
 NATO

2018 conferences
2018 in Brussels
2018 in international relations
21st-century diplomatic conferences (NATO)
Belgium and NATO
Diplomatic conferences in Belgium
Events in Brussels
July 2018 events in Belgium
NATO summits
Trump administration controversies